In enzymology, an oxoglutarate dehydrogenase (NADP+) is an enzyme that catalyzes the chemical reaction

2-oxoglutarate + CoA + NADP+  succinyl-CoA + CO2 + NADPH

The 3 substrates of this enzyme are 2-oxoglutarate, CoA, and NADP+, whereas its 3 products are succinyl-CoA, CO2, and NADPH.

This enzyme belongs to the family of oxidoreductases, specifically those acting on the aldehyde or oxo group of donor with NAD+ or NADP+ as acceptor.  The systematic name of this enzyme class is 2-oxoglutarate:NADP+ 2-oxidoreductase (CoA-succinylating). This enzyme is also called oxoglutarate dehydrogenase (NADP+).

References

 

EC 1.2.1
NADPH-dependent enzymes
Enzymes of unknown structure